Thompson is a Croatian ethno hard rock band, founded by songwriter and lead vocalist Marko Perković ("Thompson"), who is often identified with the band itself. The lineup consists of Tomislav Mandarić, Ivan Ivanković, Duje Ivić, and Ivica Bilić Ike.

The band name originates from the Thompson submachine gun, a nickname given to Perković while he fought in the Croatian War of Independence. Although predominantly formed in Čavoglave, Thompson is currently based in Zagreb. The band came to prominence during the Croatian War of Independence with the release of their first single "Bojna Čavoglave". In 1992, Thompson gained further popularity in Croatia with the release of the band's first album Moli mala. They later regained popularity with the popular hit "Prijatelji" in 1998.

In 2002, Thompson began their first major tour to promote the album E, moj narode. This tour continued sporadically until 2005, and included concerts at the Sydney Entertainment Centre and Melbourne's Vodafone Arena. In May 2005, the album was declared a Diamond Record with more than 60,000 copies sold. Touring continued in 2006 with Bilo jednom u Hrvatskoj, again performing internationally with concerts in Germany, Sweden, Australia, Canada, and the United States.

Thompson features annually at Victory Day celebrations in Perković's hometown of Čavoglave. The band has garnered controversy for its alleged glorification or promotion of the World War II Ustaše fascist regime in its songs and concerts.

History
Marko Perković, the founder of the group, was born 27 October 1966 in the village of Čavoglave in the rural Dalmatian hinterland of the Socialist Federal Republic of Yugoslavia.

He first gained prominence in 1991 at the beginning of the Yugoslav wars, most specifically the Croatian War of Independence, with the song "Bojna Čavoglave". Perković was not a professional singer, nor had the band yet been formed. It was reportedly composed as an anthem for the territorial defence unit hastily formed by natives of Čavoglave, at that time under JNA and Serb paramilitary attacks. He released it under his own battle name, Thompson.

In 1992, Perković published his first album, Moli mala. By this time he had left active service in the Croatian Army, and toured with other performers of the Rock za Hrvatsku in a humanitarian concert, but he returned to military service for a short time in 1995 to participate in Operation Storm. As time passed, Perković lost his early popularity and through the 1990s he remained relatively less popular. He released some minor hits, such as "Zmija me za srce ugrizla" and "Grkinjo, znaj, svemu je kraj", but regained popularity after "Prijatelji" in 1998, followed in the same year by his fourth album, Winds from Dinara, which includes two other popular releases: "Zaustavi se Vjetre": and "Lijepa li si".

After the parliamentary elections in 2000, a left-wing government was formed, led by the president of the Social Democratic Party (SDP), Ivica Račan, last secretary-general of the League of Communists of Croatia and a prominent leader in Croatia's push for independence. This sparked angry reactions among Croatian nationalists and Perković regained popularity. During his concerts he made obscene comments about the Croatian Prime Minister at the time, Ivica Račan, and the President of the Republic, Stipe Mesić.

Many of the band's songs (such as "Bojna Čavoglave", "Lijepa li si", and "Zaustavi se vjetre") became major hits in Croatia, and are played at football games and other large events. The band has won the Croatian music competitions Melodije Mostara (in 2001) and the Croatian Radio Festival (in 2006), and has performed annually on Victory and Homeland Thanksgiving Day, with the proceeds going to the families of Croatian soldiers.

E, Moj Narode tour
After the release of E, Moj Narode in 2002, the band began touring to promote the album. The height of the tour was a concert at the Poljud football stadium in Split. The concert was attended by some 40,000 spectators. During the song "Lijepa li si", Miroslav Škoro, Alen Vitasović, Mate Bulić, Giuliano Đanić, and Mladen Grdović joined him on stage. At the concert, Perković stated that his songs mark his three loves: God, homeland, and family.

The concert sparked controversies. Two seats in the audience were reserved for Mirko Norac (convicted war criminal, who was on trial at the time) and Ante Gotovina (found not guilty in 2012 on all charges by an appeals panel at the ICTY, but at the time a fugitive). At the beginning of the concert, just moments before Perković stepped onstage, the audience sang the Ustaše song "Evo zore, evo dana".

In 2003, Thompson released a best-of CD. Also in 2004, vocalist and bassist Tiho Orlić released a solo eponymous album, Tiho, which contained a couple of Thompson songs, and on which Perković collaborated. This tour continued sporadically into 2005. Internationally, he played at Sydney's Entertainment Centre and Melbourne's Vodafone Arena in May 2005. By the end of the tour, the album was declared a Diamond Record after more than 60,000 copies were sold.

Bilo jednom u Hrvatskoj tour
Bilo jednom u Hrvatskoj was released in December 2006. Despite the late release, it became the second-highest selling Croatian album of the year.  Thompson soon after announced an initial tour of Croatia and select European cities beginning after the Lenten season through summer, culminating with a performance at Maksimir Stadium in Zagreb. The tour began in Vukovar in the Borovo Naselje neighborhood, where approximately 4000 fans came out to watch the group perform.

The tour continued to Đakovo before going to Frankfurt, where he performed for a crowd of approximately 15,000 at Ballsporthalle. By June, the album had sold 100,000 copies—very high by Croatian standards. The first tour leg in Croatia ended with the biggest concert at Maksimir Stadium in Zagreb, where they performed in front of 60,000 spectators. The concert was broadcast live on Croatian Public Television. As part of the second leg, Thompson performed at Split's Stadion Stari plac in front of 25,000 people. The show was recorded for a live CD release.

He had two shows scheduled in November 2007 for New York City, which provoked protests from several Jewish groups. These groups called on the Archdiocese of New York to stop the show, but the diocese declined, reportedly finding no evidence that the group promoted neo-Nazism. A Washington Post reporter who attended one of the concerts also questioned the purported neo-Nazi link. The band's concert in Toronto attracted 5000 people to the Croatian center where it was held, after the original venue with a capacity of 2,500, Kool Haus, cancelled. The rest of the tour continued as planned.

Thompson returned to Croatia in November 2007, and continued with shows in Bosnia and Herzegovina cities including Mostar, Tomislavgrad, Novi Travnik, Široki Brijeg, and Čapljina. His last show in Croatia before heading to Australia was Cibona's annual Christmas benefit show at Dražen Petrović Basketball Hall with proceeds going to the Zagreb Cathedral. The tour in Australia included shows at Melbourne's Festival Hall, Sydney's Sydney United Sports Centre on New Year's Eve, Adelaide, and Perth. The B'nai B'rith Anti-Defamation Commission of Australia lobbied to prevent the band from receiving Australian visas, but government officials found the band did not violate any terms which would impede their receiving visas. After several guest appearances in Croatia, the rapper Shorty was confirmed to be joining Thompson for the Australian leg of the tour, which collectively drew in 22,000 fans at four shows. In the new year the tour continued with shows in Rijeka, Krapina, and Čakovec before pausing for the group's usual Lenten break.

After the break the group had shows in Zadar's Jazine Arena and in Gothenburg, Sweden. A show in Nova Gradiška had proceeds going to the construction of a local Catholic church. After Nova Gradiška the band proceeded with shows in Varaždin, Karlovac, and Županja. Local authorities threatened to block the band's 21 May concert in Stuttgart, Germany. However, they backed down after the concert's German Croat backers threatened legal action against the city and translated twenty of the band's songs into German for the authorities' benefit.

Thompson was asked by Croatian veteran groups to perform at the Defender's Day celebrations at Zagreb's Ban Jelačić Square, the concert being free of charge. An estimated 55–60,000 people attended the concert by the official police estimates, some figures placed the number at 100,000.

Thompson played in Kupres on 19 July at the Croatian Defenders Stadium as part of the town's Saint Elijah celebrations. The band played in Livno on 27 July to end Canton 10's international Tera conference in front of a crowd of 15–20,000 people.  In 2008, in celebration of Victory Day in Čavoglave, Thompson drew a crowd between 60,000 and 100,000.

Guests included musicians Mate Bulić and Dražen Zečić, former Croatian international footballers Ardian Kozniku and Ivica Mornar, and international basketball player Dino Rađa. Thompson played in Neum on 29 August in front of 5,000 spectators with profits going to the building of a new church in the town. On 30 May 2008, Thompson held a concert on Ban Jelačić Square. The tour officially ended on 28 December 2008 at the same Borovo Naselje venue in which it began, with another humanitarian concert with profits going to Vukovar's hospital. It was attended by hospital's director and war-time heroine Vesna Bosanac, who greeted him on stage.

It was estimated by Thompson's staff that almost 950,000 tickets were sold during the whole two-year-long tour. In June 2008, Perković was named the third most influential person in Croatian show business by Globus magazine.

Ora et labora tour

The tour started on 22 June 2013 at the Zenith in Munich, Germany in front of 4,000 people. The tour continued with the concert at the Poljud football stadium in Split on 30 June 2013. The concert was reportedly attended by 50,000 spectators.

Setlist
Sokolov krik (Falcon's Shriek)
Dobrodošli (Welcome)
Uvijek vjerni tebi (Forever Faithful to You)
Nema predaje (No Surrender)
Bog i Hrvati (God and the Croats)
Kletva kralja Zvonimira (The Curse of King Zvonimir)
Moj dida i ja (My Grandfather and I)
Zaustavi se vjetre (Slow Down, Wind)
Bosna (Bosnia)
Zapali vatru (Burn Fire)
E, moj narode (Oh, My People)
Duh ratnika (The Spirit of the Warriors)
Maranatha (Maranatha)
Neću izdat ja (I Will Not Betray)
Geni kameni (Genes Made of Stone)
Samo je ljubav tajna dvaju svjetova (Only Love is the Secret of the Two Worlds)
Sine moj (My Son)
Lipa Kaja (Pretty Kata)
Bojna Čavoglave/Neka ni'ko ne dira u moj Mali dio svemira (Bojna Čavoglave/Let No One Touch My Small Part of the Universe)
Moj Ivane (My Ivan)
Lijepa li si (How Pretty You Are)
Diva Grabovčeva (The Diva of Grabov)
Put u raj (Road to Paradise)
Početak (The Beginning)

Lyrics and themes
Thompson's songs are often marked with Christian and historic themes, and include folklore elements. Many of his songs deal with religion: "Radost s Visina", "Neću izdat ja", "Dan dolazi", and "Početak", or his own family and birthplace: "Vjetar s Dinare", "Sine Moj", and "Moj Dida i Ja". Thompson, along with Fra Šito Ćorić and Miroslav Škoro, performed the official anthem at the Croatian World Games. Thompson composed the anthem of the Croatian Party of Rights. Thompson's "Lijepa li si" was recorded with Miroslav Škoro, Mate Bulić, Giulliano, Mladen Grdović, and Alen Vitasović. Other projects have included "Ljuta guja" with Jasmin Stavros, and "Reci brate moj" with Škoro.

Perković has said he is personally a fan of such bands as Nightwish, Iron Maiden, AC/DC, and Dream Theater, among others. Thompson recorded hard rock similar to these bands for the first time on the album Bilo jednom u Hrvatskoj, considered by some to be a rock opera. A Washington Post writer described the New York stop on the Bilo jednom u Hrvatskoj tour as sounding "like Iron Maiden doing Eastern European folk".

Controversies

Neo-nazism speech
Controversy regarding the alleged promotion of the fascist Ustaše regime led to a number of banned performances, including the band's concert in the Netherlands in 2003.

Thompson became popular with their 1991 hit song "Bojna Čavoglave", which was released during the Croatian War of Independence. The song depicts a battle involving a battalion of Croatian soldiers from Čavoglave, a village in the Dalmatian rural hinterland (and Perković's birthplace). The song opens with the WW2-era nazi Ustaše salute Za dom spremni (Ready for the homeland). 

In 2007, the Anti Defamation League reported that many of the Thompson concert attendees, who were primarily young people, wore clothing with Ustashe symbols and carried banners with "anti-Serb, anti-semitic and anti-Roma rhetoric". They performed Nazi salutes in response to the band's "traditional “war cry” of the Ustashe" done at the beginning of the concert. Ustashe material was also allegedly sold at venues.

During the Croatian War of Independence, the band performed Jasenovac i Gradiška Stara, which aggrandizes genocide against Serbs, Jews and Roma committed by the Ustaše at the Jasenovac and Stara Gradiška concentration camps.

Banned performances
In 2003, the band was barred from having a concert in Amsterdam. Regarding the cancellation of the concert, Perkovic allegedly told a Croatian newspaper, "It is all to blame on the Jews. I have nothing against them and I did nothing to them. I know that Jesus Christ also did nothing against them, but still they hanged him on the cross. So what can I expect as a small man?".

Two weeks after the concert in Zagreb on 17 June 2007, Perković made this statement regarding claims by the Simon Wiesenthal Center that he is a fascist: "Me and members of my band saw nobody with Ustaša iconography among 60 and more thousand people on Maksimir."
The performance included the use of Ustaše slogans. At Thompson's Zagreb concert for the Day of Defenders, a group of youths was heard chanting "Ubi Srbina" ("Kill the Serb"), according to some Croatian media sources.

The most discussed concert was the first ever banned in Croatia, in the Istrian town of Umag. After this ban, Thompson asked for permission to hold a concert in Pula, Istria's most populous city. When this was denied, the band initiated and lost court actions against the city of Pula for "human rights violations". After the court decision, the band's lawyer declared that sooner or later Thompson would perform in Pula. In late December 2008, he managed to secure permission to organize a concert in Pazin, despite fierce opposition from the Istrian Democratic Assembly, the region's leading political party. These attacks led to an increase of tensions, which reached their climax the night of 11 December, when an explosive device was ignited outside the concert venue. Although IDS MP Damir Kajin accused Thompson's fans, it turned out that the offender, Vilim Bon (then aged 59), who was injured in the defragration and arrested by police, was acting to stop the concert. The concert took place as planned on 20 December 2008, followed by two more shows on 21 and 22 December due to reported demand.

Thompson was banned from performing in Switzerland multiple times, including in 2009. Their planned 2014 Berlin performance was cancelled and in 2017, they were banned from performing in Austria due to their extremism as well as in Slovenia.

Alleged plagiarism
It has been noted in Serbian media that Thompson might have used the melodies of a Chetnik song, Nad Kraljevom živa vatra seva, for their Anica kninska kraljica, and a Partisan song, Sivi sokole, for their Bojna Čavoglave.

Perković's response to accusations
Perković has stated he is neither an Ustaša nor a fascist, but a patriot. The Croatian Helsinki Committee has come out against any potential bans, with its president Ivo Banac referring to such calls from Stipe Mesić and Damir Kajin as a "weakening of the democratic order". At his concert in Vukovar on 13 April 2007, he stated:

I can't command anybody what to wear at my concert, and I have never encouraged anybody to wear a cap or shirt with letter 'U'. My message to all of them (and that I would say this evening too, if I saw [anything like that]): wear the insignia of the victorious Croatian army from Croatian War of Independence. It is sad that young people return so far in history and fall for propaganda.

Perković's last tour, Bilo jednom u Hrvatskoj, was protested by various Jewish organizations. Held in Frankfurt, the organizations vehemently requested that the German government ban the concert because of its alleged fascist lyrics. When the German government received the transcript of Thompson's songs, the request to ban the concert was immediately rejected. At the 17 June 2007, concert at Maksimir Stadium, Zagreb, Perković repeated his claim that he is not a fascist.

The audience, in a sign of approval, shouted a medieval Croatian battle-cry (mostly known from Ivan Zajc's opera Nikola Šubić Zrinski and today used mostly to boost morale at soccer matches), "U boj, u boj – za narod svoj!". In anticipation of a New Year's Eve tour in Australia and New Zealand, Perković released an interview with the local Croatian community magazine, Hrvatski Vjesnik, a translation of which was published in the "New Generation" English language supplement, in which he stated that the vast majority of Croats (including himself) do not have negative feelings towards Jewish people or their religion, and expressed sympathy  after the recent controversy with the Simon Wiesenthal Center. However, based on his tumultuous history, which includes many incendiary and hateful remarks towards Serbs and other ethnic groups, coupled with his seeming support for Ustaše movements, this retort was widely believed to be nothing more than politically correct posturing.

After the concert in Ban Jelacic square, planned concerts in Switzerland and Austria were banned, allegedly for security reasons; a similar effort in Stuttgart was rebuked by local Croatians and Germans of Croatian descent, threatening legal action.

Thompson's music and football
Thompson's hit song "Lijepa li si" (meaning "How beautiful you are", referring to Croatia) is traditionally played after and at halftime at all matches of the Croatian national football team at Maksimir stadium.

A controversy resulted in 2007 when, during a match against Israel, the song was not played. After the match Croatian players Josip Šimunić and Darijo Srna voiced their concerns about the song not being played. Former Croatian international and longtime member of the Israeli league Đovani Roso went on to claim the song had not bothered anyone at the Israel Football Association. Croatian manager Slaven Bilić came to Thompson's defence. After its 3–2 win over England at Wembley Stadium, the Croatian national team began singing the song themselves along with Croatian fans.

Humanitarian work

The band has held numerous humanitarian concerts. Thompson made a guest appearance at a humanitarian concert in Jastrebarsko on 5 February 2005, to raise money for a local person's lymphoma treatment. Mate Bulić and Thompson held a concert in Slavonski Brod in 2006 with proceeds going to the building of a shrine near the city. Thompson participated in the October 2006 humanitarian concert Noć zvijezda, noć hitova. Following the fires along the Kornati coast during the summer of 2007, the band participated in the recording of a memorial song "Ovo nije kraj", as well as a charity football match at Poljud attended by 30,000 people.

Perković performed at the annual Christmas concert in Zagreb's Dražen Petrović Basketball Hall. The group performed at the humanitarian concert Pjesmom za život in Ljubuški on 30 October 2008, with proceeds going to the ill Herzegovinian Croat singer Jozo Milićević-Galini.

Perković appeared at a memorial football tournament for the deceased from the Croatian War of Independence near Imotski to hand out the awards to the winners. In November 2008, he appeared at a humanitarian concert in Zagreb headlined by Mate Bulić with proceeds going to the Ana Rukavina Foundation, founded to establish a nationwide bone marrow donation network.

Band members
The only permanent member of the band is Perković, and he is often identified with the band. 
The band line-up on the Bilo jednom u Hrvatskoj tour was Fedor Boić, Damir Lipošek Kex,  Tomislav Mandarić, Tiho Orlić, and Damir Šomen. The band line-up for the Ora et labora tour is: Ivica Bilić Ike (drums), Ivan Ivanković (guitar), Duje Ivić (synthesizer), Tiho Orlić (bass and back vocals) and Perković.

Discography

Studio albums
 1992 - Bojna Čavoglave
 1992 - Moli mala
 1995 - Vrijeme škorpiona
 1996 - Geni kameni
 1998 - Vjetar s Dinare
 2002 - E, moj narode
 2006 - Bilo jednom u Hrvatskoj
 2011 - Glazba iz Filma Josef
 2013 - Ora et labora

Compilation albums
 1992 - Najveći hitovi 
 2001 - The best of
 2003 - Sve najbolje
 2008 - Druga strana
 2015 - The best of collection
 2016 - Antologija

Concert videos
 2002 - Turneja: E, moj narode
 2007 - Turneja: Bilo jednom u Hrvatskoj
 2013 - Turneja: Ora et labora

By Tiho Orlić

Festival appearances
In Croatian music, festivals play a large role, with new songs frequently being released for a festival and the best song being declared winner. Thompson has appeared at the following festivals:
Croatian Radio Festival: 1999, 2002, 2006
Etnofest Neum: 1996, 1998, 1999, 2000
Melodije Mostara: 2001
Split Festival: 1992, 1993, 1994, 1995, 1996, 1997, 2002

References

External links

  Official website
 "Rocking The Boat", Washington Post, 5 November 2007
Voinovich urges cancellation of concert in Cleveland, Ohio by Croatian rock star Thompson
Coverage of Thompson, thestar.com
"A Croatian rock star flirts with the Nazi past", International Herald Tribune, 1 July 2007

Christian rock groups
Christian metal musical groups
Croatian heavy metal musical groups
Folk rock groups
Hard rock musical groups
Musical groups established in 1991
Pop rock groups
Symphonic metal musical groups
1991 establishments in Croatia
Croatian nationalism
Far-right politics in Croatia